Al Batin Football Club is a Saudi Arabian professional football club based in Hafar al-Batin, Eastern Province, that competes in the Saudi Professional League. The club was founded in 1979.

Al-Batin's colours are sky blue and black. At the end of the 2007–08 season, they won their first promotion to Saudi Second Division. On 25 March 2011, Al-Batin won their first promotion to Saudi First Division. They  play their home matches at the Al-Batin Club Stadium.

Honours
Saudi First Division
Winners (1): 2019–20 
Runners-up (1): 2015–16
Saudi Second Division
Runners-up (1): 2010–11
Saudi Third Division
Runners-up (1): 2007–08

Current squad
As of 26 June 2021:

Managerial history

 Rachid Mezghiche (2002 – 2003)
 Jamal El Khodary (August 1, 2005 – April 1, 2007)
 Hassan Abdelfattah (August 13, 2007 – May 1, 2008)
 Abdelhamid Salmi (July 1, 2009 – September 16, 2009)
 Rachid Mezghiche (September 16, 2009 – May 1, 2010)
 Emad Al-Qasem (July 1, 2010 – December 15, 2011)
 Nasser Nefzi (December 22, 2011 – February 13, 2014)
 Ednaldo Patricio (February 14, 2014 – April 6, 2014)
 Naif Al-Anezi (May 9, 2014 – August 31, 2014)
 Habib Ben Romdhane (September 1, 2014 – February 12, 2016)
 Yousri bin Kahla (February 12, 2016 – April 27, 2016)
 Khalid Al-Koroni (April 27, 2016 – May 27, 2016)
 Adel Abdel Rahman (June 8, 2016 – November 6, 2016)
 Khalid Al-Koroni (November 6, 2016 – May 17, 2017)
 Quim Machado (May 24, 2017 – February 4, 2018)
 Ciprian Panait (February 6, 2018 – May 31, 2018)
 Franky Vercauteren (July 26, 2018 – November 1, 2018)
 Yousef Al-Ghadeer (November 10, 2018 – February 17, 2019)
 Ciprian Panait (February 17, 2019 – May 31, 2019)
 Ridha Jeddi (July 6, 2019 – September 24, 2019)
 José Garrido (September 24, 2019 – March 20, 2021)
 Aleksandar Veselinovic (March 24, 2021 – June 1, 2021)
 Nenad Lalatović (June 25, 2021  — October 17, 2021)
 Darko Nović (caretaker) (October 17, 2021  — October 21, 2021)
 Alen Horvat (October 21, 2021  — February 19, 2023)
 Zdravko Logarušić (February 19, 2023  — )

See also

 Hafar al-Batin

References

Al Batin FC
Batin
Batin
Batin
Batin